Fort Wayne Printing Company Building is a historic commercial building located in downtown Fort Wayne, Indiana. It was built in 1911, and is a four-story, three bay, Classical Revival style brick building with white terra cotta trim.

It was listed on the National Register of Historic Places in 1988.

References

Commercial buildings on the National Register of Historic Places in Indiana
Commercial buildings completed in 1911
Neoclassical architecture in Indiana
Buildings and structures in Fort Wayne, Indiana
National Register of Historic Places in Fort Wayne, Indiana
1911 establishments in Indiana